The 2007 B.League season was the inaugural season of B.League, and the first ever professional tournament in the history of Bangladesh. The season started on 2 March and concluded on 1 August.

Teams
12 teams were added to the league, however Sylhet DSA withdrew from the league.

Personnel and sponsoring

Head coaching changes

League table

Top scorers

References

External links

Bangladesh - List of final tables (RSSSF)

Bangladesh Football Premier League seasons
Bangladesh
Bangladesh
1